Aphaenops bonneti is a species of beetle in the subfamily Trechinae. It was described by Foures in 1948.

References

bonneti
Beetles described in 1948